C57 may refer to:
 , an Admirable-class minesweeper of the Mexican Navy
 Caldwell 57, a barred irregular galaxy
 C57BL/6, a common inbred strain of lab mouse
 Fried Liver Attack, a chess opening
 , a County-class heavy cruiser of the Royal Navy
 Hours of Work and Manning (Sea) Convention, 1936 of the International 
 JNR Class C57, a class of Japanese 4-6-2 "Pacific" type steam locomotive
 Lockheed C-57 Lodestar, an American military aircraft

See also
 C-57D, a fictional spaceship from the movie Forbidden Planet